Albert Brenen (5 October 1915 in South Shields, England – February 1995) was an English footballer.

Brenen joined York City from St. John's College in 1938.

References

1915 births
Footballers from South Shields
1995 deaths
English footballers
Association football midfielders
York City F.C. players
Scarborough F.C. players
English Football League players